Mometa anthophthora is a moth of the family Gelechiidae. It was described by Edward Meyrick in 1937. It is found in Uganda.

The wingspan is about 15 mm. The forewings are blackish fuscous irregularly mixed or sprinkled with pale ochreous except on a narrow costal streak. There is a small yellow-ochreous spot on the costa at three-fourths. The hindwings are grey.

The larvae feed on the flowerheads of Dombeya emarginata.

References

Moths described in 1937
Pexicopiini